Johanna Theresia Lamberg (1639–1716), countess of Harrach, was a Spanish court official. She was a lady-in-waiting and favorite of the queen regent of Spain, Mariana of Austria, in 1653-60, with whom she corresponded until Mariana's death. She was married to the imperial ambassador to Spain in 1673–76, and played an important role as a mediator and channel for the sale of offices as well as in the diplomatic service, particularly concerning the proposed marriage between Charles II of Spain and Maria Antonia of Austria.

References

 Glenda Sluga, Carolyn James:   Women, Diplomacy and International Politics since 1500

1639 births
1716 deaths
17th-century Spanish people
Spanish ladies-in-waiting
Spanish royal favourites